The Law on the Referendum on Self-determination of Catalonia, is the name of a Catalan law that governs the holding of the Catalan independence referendum of 1 October 2017, a binding self-determination referendum on the independence of Catalonia.

On 6 September 2017, after more than 12 hours of heated debate, the Parliament of Catalonia passed the law with 72 votes in favor from the pro-independence ruling coalition JxSí and CUP-CC; the opposition party CSQP abstained (10 votes) and other 52 opposition parliamentarians left the chamber before the votes were cast. Even though the laws were public weeks before, the vote didn't appear on the day's agenda until the last minute to avoid the Spanish Constitutional Court banning it. Some opposition parties accused the regional body's top speaker, Carme Forcadell, of fast-tracking the law through parliament by altering the day's agenda to introduce the issue, not allowing them to appeal the law before being put up to vote. Members from JxSí acknowledged it was not their preferred method, but justified it in that it was the only way to get the bill on the floor without being blocked and that it was not "any ordinary law". In 2018, the Constitutional Court ruled that the rights of the opposition where indeed undermined.

It was suspended on 7 September by the Constitutional Court after accepting an appeal from the Spanish government.

See also
Law of juridical transition and foundation of the Republic
2017 Catalan independence referendum
Catalan independence
Catalan Republic

References

External links 
 LLEI 19/2017, del 6 de setembre, del referèndum d'autodeterminació. 
 Law on the Referendum on Self-determination  

2017 in Catalonia
2017 in law
2017 documents
Catalan independence movement
Catalan law
September 2017 events in Spain